Inc. 1 is an album by pianist John Hicks's Trio recorded in Japan in 1985 and released on the Japanese DIW label.

Reception
The Allmusic review stated "This is an enjoyable date worth picking up".

Track listing
All compositions by John Hicks except as indicated
 "Ruby, My Dear" (Thelonious Monk) - 6:42 (bonus track on CD reissue)
 "Bookie Please" - 6:30 
 "For Heaven's Sake" (Elise Bretton, Sherman Edwards, Donald Meyer) - 4:14
 "Book Bossa" - 7:15
 "Inc. 1" - 6:13
 "Avojca" - 6:27
 "'Round Midnight" (Thelonious Monk) - 8:14

Personnel
John Hicks - piano
Walter Booker - bass
Idris Muhammad  - drums

References

John Hicks (jazz pianist) albums
1985 albums
DIW Records albums